Staten Island Economic Development Corporation (SIEDC) is a 501(c)(3) non-profit organization that serves as a lead advocate for economic development of Staten Island's economy. The organization is responsible for over $900 million in new investments, the creation of over 12,500 jobs, the development of over 6,000 acres of vacant industrial land by providing assistance to developers and companies implementing projects in the borough, while at the same time serving the smallest entrepreneur and small business owner with tailored financing, procurement, and real estate assistance. Every year approximately 3,000 businesses and individuals are assisted by the SIEDC through financing assistance, tax incentives, job training, and technical assistance. Since its establishment, SIEDC has organized and planned yearly community events to benefit the public at no cost, such as the SIEDC Business Conference and the SIEDC Health and Wellness Expo. Cesar J. Claro serves as the President & CEO of the organization.

Mission 

Established in 1993, SIEDC's mission is to enhance Staten Island's economy by promoting public and private investment, and encouraging responsible and sustainable development, all of which improve the quality of life and provide broad and diverse employment opportunities in the borough.

Projects and programs 

West Shore Light Rail - In 2005, SIEDC recognized the unlimited potential of the hundreds of acres between the Goethals Bridge and the Outer bridge Crossing in the south. Numerous programs have been launched to assist in growing the area including the West Shore Industrial Business Improvement District (BID), the West Shore Brownfield Opportunity Area (BOA), various infrastructure and storm water studies and the effort to connect the West Shore via mass transit. 

Today, nearly 20 major projects are now under development on the West Shore including the Matrix Development/Amazon/Ikea site, Freshkills Park, Staten Island Stages and other large scale development projects throughout the corridor. With over 7,000 new potential employees along the West Shore, the borough must supply effective mass internal mass transit as well as connectivity to Manhattan, New Jersey and the rest of the region via mass transit. 

In 2004 and 2009, SIEDC conducted studies to determine the need and feasibility of a light rail system that would travel along the median of the West Shore Expressway and connect the South and West Shores with the Hudson-Bergen Light Rail on the Bayonne side of the bridge.

This project would create a new route for Staten Island commuters while alleviating traffic congestion related to the thousands of new jobs along the transit corridor. Thanks to funding secured by State Senator Andrew Lanza and Assemblyman Michael Cu sick, in May 2017, the Metropolitan Transportation Authority (MTA) announced that it would undertake the Alternatives Analysis (AA) for the project. This is SIEDC is actively pursuing additional funding for the Environmental Impact Statement (EIS) which would follow the AA. 

SI Skyway - The abandoned North Shore Rail Right-Of-Way (ROW) stretches over five miles from St. George neighborhood to Arlington neighborhood on Staten Island. 

Drawing inspiration from the highly successful Manhattan High Line, the SIEDC envisions a similar project being implemented in the residential and commercial neighborhood of Port Richmond. Based on the enormous economic development results the Manhattan High Line provided to the Chelsea and Meatpacking districts, SIEDC believes this project will spur unique recreational and commercial activity for Port Richmond Avenue. 

The proposed Skyway project will occupy a half-mile elevated portion of the rail line between Richmond Terrace and Heberton Avenue and Nicholas Avenue. 

The Port Richmond neighborhood suffered a severe economic decline in the latter half of the 20th century, largely as a result of the shift of development and commercial activity to the center of the island, following the construction of the Verrazano Narrows Bridge. Port Richmond Avenue was once a unique center of commercial activity serving thousands of residents on the north shore. The lack of activated park space, transportation connectivity and the shift of commercial centers all led to the decline of local commercial activity.

SI Gondola - Over 10 years ago the SIEDC began the discussion on the West Shore Light Rail and now SIEDC is looking to the skies for the next endeavor – the SI Gondola. In 2015, SIEDC proposed an aerial gondola system to connect Staten Island to the rest of the region and in 2016 hosted a global design competition for concepts and proposals. As a result of this work, and the selection of Leitner-Poma of America and their route between Staten Island and Bayonne, SIEDC is working with local elected officials and agencies to bring the project to fruition.

Healthy Housing - SIEDC’s approach to “Healthy Housing” addresses numerous obstacles to housing development including limited local political support, cost of construction, prohibitive zoning, a limited history of affordable development and the need for more strategic partnerships with developers.

Healthy housing is critical for the growth of the community and involves a variety of housing strategies including new building stock, access to transit opportunities, environmental resiliency, and housing for young professionals and seniors who are significantly represented on Staten Island.

Local Needs Assessment - LOCAL NEEDS ASSESSMENT
Staten Island has seen significant development over the past five years. Planning efforts have not kept pace with development, and local leaders are concerned with a variety of economic development issues. In response, the Staten Island Economic Development Corporation (SIEDC) has received grants from New York State Senator Diane Savino and National Grid to conduct a Local Needs Assessment for the borough of Staten Island.

Neighborhood development 

The SIEDC manages several business improvement districts throughout the borough along with a merchant’s associations. SIEDC has been able to assist with town cleanups, restaurant crawls, holiday tree lighting, and other fun events for the public to enjoy. Each town has its own sights and activities to enjoy. Read about them all below.

New Dorp BID - The mission of the New Dorp Local Development Corporation is to enhance the New Dorp economy by promoting public and private investment, providing services and events, and encouraging responsible and sustainable development, all of which improve the quality of life and provide broad and diverse employment opportunities in the New Dorp area.

West Shore BID - In May 2012, Staten Island Economic Development Corporation (SIEDC) was selected by the New York City Economic Development Corporation (NYCEDC) to assist in developing a new industrial business improvement district on the West Shore of Staten Island. Since its inception in July 2015, the West Shore Business Improvement District (WS-IBID) has provided much-needed services including private maintenance, private security, signage and wayfinding, advocacy on behalf of property owners and important infrastructure improvements. The ultimate goal of the WS-IBID is to transform the West Shore into a premier industrial corridor for Staten Island and the City.

Victory Boulevard Merchants Group - Victory Blvd. Merchants Association has been created to benefit the local community. The SIEDC is helping to grow and improve the Victory Boulevard shopping experience. It started with Holiday lights, new trash receptacles, a cleaning crew, and some beautification. That’s just the start. We are planning lots more. If you love Westerleigh and you would like to get involved contact the group for more information.

Huguenot Merchants Association - The SIEDC provides marketing and economic development opportunities to small businesses in Huguenot, Staten Island.

Richmond Road Merchants Association - The SIEDC provides marketing and economic development opportunities to small businesses on Richmond Road in Staten Island.

Richmond Valley Merchants Association - The SIEDC provides marketing and economic development opportunities to small businesses on Richmond Valley in Staten Island.

Membership 

To achieve SIEDC's mission, the organization relies on the support of small businesses and corporations. SIEDC offers 5 different levels of membership and has over 200 members.

"Beyond The Ferry" 

"Beyond The Ferry" is a CTV series which features SIEDC members and sponsors who educate the public about best business practices.

References

Non-profit organizations based in New York City
Economy of Staten Island
Economic development organizations in the United States